USS Maud (SP-1009) was a United States Navy patrol vessel in commission from 1917 to 1919.

Maud was built as a private wooden motorboat of the same name. She was remodeled in 1913.

On 15 June 1917, the U.S. Navy acquired Maud under a free lease from her owner, W. H. Pattison, for use as a section patrol boat during World War I. She was commissioned the same day as USS Maud (SP-1009).

Assigned to the 5th Naval District, Maud operated in the Norfolk, Virginia, area for the rest of World War I. In addition to carrying out patrol duties, she served as a dispatch boat and on special services duties for the Commandant, 5th Naval District.
 
Maud was returned to Pattison on 7 January 1919.

Notes

References
 
 Department of the Navy Naval History and Heritage Command Online Library of Selected Images: U.S. Navy Ships: USS Maud (SP-1009), 1917-1919. Originally civilian motor boat Maud
 NavSource Online: Section Patrol Craft Photo Archive Maud (SP 1009)

Patrol vessels of the United States Navy
World War I patrol vessels of the United States